Bunney is a surname which may refer to:

Sir Edmund Cradock-Hartopp, 1st Baronet (1749–1833), British politician born Edmund Bunney
Elliot Bunney (born 1966), Scottish former sprinter
Joe Bunney (born 1993), English footballer
John Wharlton Bunney (1828–1882), English topographical and landscape artist
Michael Bunney (1873–1926), English architect
Sydney John Bunney (1877–1928), English late Impressionist artist
William E. Bunney, American neuroscientist

See also
Bunney Brooke (1921–2000), stage name of the Australian actress born Dorothy Cronin